Cristian Nahuel Maidana (born 7 April 1998) is an Argentine professional footballer who plays as a midfielder for Chacarita Juniors, on loan from Ferro Carril Oeste.

Career
Maidana's senior career began with Ferro Carril Oeste, with the midfielder being moved into their senior squad during the 2018–19 season and initially being on the substitutes bench against Instituto and Temperley in February 2019. Interim manager Jorge Cordon selected Maidana for his senior bow on 3 March during a 2–0 victory at home to Mitre. On 11 June 2022, Maidana joined Chacarita Juniors on a one-year loan.

Career statistics
.

References

External links

1998 births
Living people
Footballers from Buenos Aires
Argentine footballers
Association football midfielders
Primera Nacional players
Ferro Carril Oeste footballers
Chacarita Juniors footballers